Gol Mohak (also Romanized as Gol Moḩak and Gol Maḩak) is a village in Hoseyniyeh Rural District, Alvar-e Garmsiri District, Andimeshk County, Khuzestan Province, Iran. At the 2006 census, its population was 33, in 9 families.

References 

Populated places in Andimeshk County